"Suicide social" is a song by French rapper Orelsan and produced by Skread. It was released on September 15, 2011 as the fourth single from his second studio album Le chant des sirènes.

In the song, Orelsan assumes the persona of a distressed, working individual who spends his last minutes tackling several political, cultural and religious issues in France, including the "incompetents" serving in the French government, neo-Nazism and the LGBT community, before committing suicide by shooting himself.

Music video
The music video was released on 15 September 2011 on YouTube as part of the single's release. Directed by Mathieu Foucher, the video is largely a lyric video, where the lyrics of the song appear in the video as Orelsan raps them, along with other various illustrations in line with the song's lyrics.

Track listing
 Digital download
 "Suicide social" – 5:41

Chart performance

References

2011 singles
2011 songs
Orelsan songs
French hip hop songs
7th Magnitude singles
Songs written by Orelsan
Songs written by Skread
Song recordings produced by Skread